Agriphila poliellus is a species of moth in the family Crambidae described by Georg Friedrich Treitschke in 1832. It is found in most of Europe (except Ireland, the Benelux, the Iberian Peninsula, Switzerland, Italy, Slovenia, Norway and Greece), Turkey, Iran, the Ural, Dagestan, Kazakhstan and Central Asia. Its type locality is in Hungary.

The wingspan is 19–26 mm.

The larvae feed on Poa species, possibly including Poa annua.

References

Moths described in 1832
Crambini
Moths of Europe
Moths of Asia